Easy Come Easy Go may refer to:

Film and television 
 Easy Come, Easy Go (1928 film), a film starring Richard Dix
 Easy Come, Easy Go (1947 film), a film starring Barry Fitzgerald
 Easy Come, Easy Go (1967 film), a film starring Elvis Presley
 Easy Come, Easy Go (unfinished film), a proposed film starring Jan and Dean which was abandoned in 1965
 Easy Come, Easy Go, a documentary film featuring The Easybeats, filmed in 1967, released in 2012
 "Easy Come, Easy Go" (Sex and the City), a television episode

Music

Albums 
 Easy Come, Easy Go (2 Plus 1 album) or the title song (see below), 1980
 Easy Come Easy Go (George Strait album) or the title song (see below), 1993
 Easy Come, Easy Go (Joe Public album) or the title song, 1994
 Easy Come, Easy Go (Marianne Faithfull album) or the title song, 2008
 Easy Come, Easy Go (EP) or the title song (see below), by Elvis Presley, from the 1967 film
 Easy Come Easy Go, a box set by Starflyer 59, 2001

Songs 
 "Easy Come, Easy Go" (2 Plus 1 song), 1979
 "Easy Come, Easy Go" (Bobby Sherman song), 1970
 "Easy Come, Easy Go" (Elvis Presley song), 1967
 "Easy Come, Easy Go" (George Strait song), 1993
 "Easy Come Easy Go" (Winger song), 1990
 "Easy Come, Easy Go!", by B'z, 1990
 "Easy Come – Easy Go", by Bill Anderson, 1964
 "Easy Come Easy Go", by Imagine Dragons from Mercury – Act 1, 2021
 "Easy Come, Easy Go", a jazz standard written by Johnny Green and Edward Heyman, 1934
 "Easy Come Easy Go", by Grant Mclennan from Watershed, 1990

See also
 "Easy Comb, Easy Go", an episode of Happy Tree Friends